Kuzgovo (Qıźğaw) is a rural locality (a village) in Novokabanovsky Selsoviet, Krasnokamsky District, Bashkortostan, Russia. The population was 238 as of 2010. There are 3 streets.

Geography 
Kuzgovo is located 41 km south of Nikolo-Beryozovka (the district's administrative centre) by road. Bachkitau is the nearest rural locality.

References 

Rural localities in Krasnokamsky District